Küttel is a surname (a variant of Kittel). Notable people with the surname include:
Andreas Küttel (born 1979), Swiss former ski jumper
Arno Küttel (born 1963), Swiss former professional racing cyclist
Dimitrij Küttel (born 1994), Swiss handball player
Joseph Küttel (1952–1997), Swiss professional footballer

Surnames of Swiss origin